This article concerns the period 819 BC – 810 BC.

Events and trends
 817 BC—Pedubastis I declares himself king of Egypt, founding the Twenty-third Dynasty.
 814 BC—Carthage is founded by Phoenician colonists from modern-day Lebanon, led by queen Dido. The city developed into a maritime power that dominated the Mediterranean Sea.
 811 BC—Adad-nirari III succeeds his father Shamshi-Adad V as king of Assyria.

Significant people
 Homer, semi-mythological Greek writer, born (approximate date)

References